Vokesimurex kiiensis, common name Kii Murex, is a species of sea snail, a marine gastropod mollusk in the family Muricidae, the murex snails or rock snails.

Description
This species has a conical, multispiral protoconch, short shoulder spines and short, crowded, blunt spines at the base of the siphonal canal.

Distribution
This species is present from Southern Japan to Queensland, Australia, at depth of about 100 m.

References

 Houart R. (2014). Living Muricidae of the world. Muricinae. Murex, Promurex, Haustellum, Bolinus, Vokesimurex and Siratus. Harxheim: ConchBooks. 197 pp

Gastropods described in 1959
Vokesimurex